Superman and Spider-Man is an intercompany comic book jointly published by DC Comics and Marvel Comics in July 1981. Number 28 (and final) in the Marvel Treasury Edition series, it is a "sequel" to 1976's Superman vs. the Amazing Spider-Man.

Like the earlier Superman - Spider-Man crossover, the issue is noncanonical, as it assumes that the heroes and their respective cities of residence, Metropolis and New York, exist in the same universe, with no explanation given as to why they had never before met or been mentioned in each other's individual stories. It also does not explicitly mention the events of the first crossover story.

Publication history
Superman vs. the Amazing Spider-Man was very much a collaboration between the two companies; this second treasury-sized edition was largely the work of Marvel, with DC's approval. The first team-up featured the heroes' most popular enemies, Lex Luthor and Doctor Octopus, but with this story writer Jim Shooter clearly sought plot convenience over "rogues gallery" prominence, and chose Doctor Doom (more typically a Fantastic Four villain, though  he had occasionally battled Spider-Man and would do so in the future as well) from Marvel, and the Parasite (a lesser-known Superman foe) from DC. The comic also pits Superman against the Hulk for the first time, and Spider-Man against Wonder Woman.

The book was officially co-written by Shooter and Marv Wolfman, who at the time was writing the popular DC title The New Teen Titans. John Buscema penciled the story, and Joe Sinnott inked the main figures. The backgrounds were inked by a who's who of contemporary Marvel talent: Terry Austin, Klaus Janson, Bob Layton, Steve Leialoha, Bob McLeod, Al Milgrom, Josef Rubinstein, Walt Simonson, Brett Breeding, and Bob Wiacek. The front cover was painted by Bob Larkin from a layout by John Romita, Sr.

Other features of the book include Superman and Spider-Man's origins on the inside front cover, an earlier cover concept on the inside back cover, and house ads for both Marvel and DC.

Plot summary
The story begins in Manhattan, where Spider-Man foils a bank robbery. Easily dispatching the criminals, his Spider-sense alerts him about a nearby construction site, but unable to determine any immediate danger, he moves on. The reader learns, however, that the site camouflages an elaborate base of the Latverian monarch Doctor Doom, connected with a years-long plot of his known as "Project Omega". Doom initiates Omega by luring the Hulk to Superman's hometown of Metropolis using a special micro-transmitter.

Spider-Man's alter-ego of Peter Parker is assigned by The Daily Bugle to cover The Hulk's advance towards Metropolis. Parker arrives in Metropolis just in time to witness the confrontation between Superman and the Hulk. Parker changes into Spider-Man, but is outclassed and unable to help. Battling the Hulk, Superman discovers the beacon and destroys it, calming the Hulk and winning his trust. The Hulk reverts to his Bruce Banner form, but Doom's plan has worked: the damage Hulk caused released the Parasite from a special underground cell. S.T.A.R. Labs takes custody of Banner, hoping to find a cure for his condition. Doom, monitoring everything, still needs Banner for his plan, and now he knows exactly where to find him.

Peter Parker goes to work for The Daily Planet while Superman's alter-ego of Clark Kent takes a leave and joins the staff of the Bugle in New York City, each seeking to investigate the crisis from a different end. Superman has realized that the Hulk's rampage was designed to free the Parasite, and reasons that, as Luthor is behind bars, only Dr. Doom could be behind the scheme. Superman visits the monarch of Latveria at its New York embassy, where Doom freely admits he's plotting world domination. Superman is sworn to uphold the laws of men, and on Latverian soil, Doom is the law. He even makes an attempt to capture the Man of Steel, but Superman uses the lead-lined everything room of Doom's headquarters to his advantage. When Doom releases some kryptonite, Superman rolls himself in the lead-lining and blocks the lethal radiation. Nonetheless, Doom remains untouchable.

While Clark Kent works his mild-mannered charm on the Bugle's cantankerous publisher J. Jonah Jameson, Peter Parker has to deal with Steve Lombard, the jock sportscaster who harassed Kent throughout the 1970s. Soon enough, Parker stumbles onto the Metropolis division of Doom's Project Omega, around the same time as Wonder Woman, who has also been following this case. Actually Doom planted evidence in order to lure Wonder Woman; her capture is also part of his master plan. Spider-Man and Wonder Woman fall into fighting under false pretenses, but quickly realize they're on the same side and join forces. Doom captures Wonder Woman before they can accomplish anything, however, while Spider-Man escapes and trails her captors to their destination, finally learning the truth about Project Omega.

The Omega installations, positioned all across the world, will go online and emit a particular radiation which will render most forms of fuel useless. Only a special generator — built by Doom, of course — will provide the energy the world needs; he will step in and make himself absolute monarch. In exchange for making him Doom's privileged enforcer, Doom enhances the Parasite's abilities with the absorbed powers of Wonder Woman, the Hulk, and Superman. The Parasite likes the idea, but only because he intends to turn on Doom. Of course, he won't get that chance; Doom knows that all that power will burn out the Parasite, turning his body into a unique kind of crystal with unique energy-absorbing properties that will allow Doom to use it to control the power of his super-reactor.

The story comes to a climax as the heroes battle the Parasite, Doom and his henchmen, and a giant robot. Doom and the Parasite turn on each other after Parasite absorbs some of Spider-Man's powers during the fight and his spider-sense alerts him to the danger of Doom's plan. Superman and Spider-Man use their respective abilities to foil Doom's plot, Spider-Man using his webbing as an improvised 'lint brush' to 'clean' Superman of the kryptonite dust Doom used to immobilize him, and Superman subsequently taking Doom's gauntlet to knock out the Parasite (correctly deducing that Doom would have developed an armour that would prevent the Parasite from absorbing him). They also prevent the accidental world-destroying explosion of Doom's super-reactor after the controls are damaged in the fight; Superman contains the reactor from the inside long enough for Spider-Man to use his spider-sense to find the lever necessary to fully turn the reactor off. The Hulk wanders off when the stasis tube in which he was imprisoned cracks, while the Parasite is recaptured and Wonder Woman released after the crisis is over. Doom manages to make it back to the Latverian Embassy, where he enjoys diplomatic immunity, seconds before Superman catches up with him.

References

External links 
 Timeshredder. "Superman and Spider-man", Everything2 (Apr. 12, 2004).

Comics by Marv Wolfman
Crossover comics
Intercompany crossovers
1981 comics debuts
Team-up comics
Doctor Doom